Flash Gordon is a 1996 animated television series based on the sci-fi comic strip of the same name. The character, who had been around in the comics pages since Alex Raymond created him in 1934, had recently starred in several film serials, a 1980 feature film, and two earlier cartoon series — The New Adventures of Flash Gordon and Defenders of the Earth.

Synopsis
In the series, the dashing blond hero was regressed to his teenage days, and he employed a hoverboard. As in previous versions, he teamed up with Dale Arden (also a teenager) and balding, bespectacled scientist Hans Zarkov. Both Flash and Dale are children of United States Air Force personnel. Flash's parents were U.S. astronauts who were in space during Ming the Merciless’ initial assault on Earth, and barely escaped his dimensional worm hole and the "space torpedoes" used by Ming's forces. The trans-dimensional portal was placed there by Ming the Merciless, despot emperor of the planet Mongo, who hoped to provide open access for his invading armies. In this series, Ming had reptilian characteristics, and seemed to have a human wife, who was long dead (it was implied in some episodes that she had gone to Earth).

When the Airforce escort sent to bring Flash and Dale to a secure location is knocked unconscious mid-flight, Dale and Flash manage to crash land the small aircraft they are on board in a marshy area with no one hurt in the crash. Flash and Dale set out to find help for the pilot and come across the laboratory of Dr. Zarkov. Zarkov mistakes them for two crew members that were supposed to bring him an important piece of his near completed inter dimensional rocket craft. Flash and Dale unknowingly are brought along for the experiment and by the time anyone realizes the mistake it is too late, the three are brought aboard Ming's ship. Once there they become aware of Ming's plans, and Ming takes a dislike to Flash immediately. With help from Ming's daughter Princess Aura the three earthlings manage to free a child prisoner of Ming's, escape and destroy his portal generator, closing the wormhole to Earth. Without the part Zarkov was expecting, and with the portal closed, Flash and crew were stuck on the Mongo side. The rest of the show follows the earthlings adventures as they discover other nearby planets with anti-Ming factions and put together a loose coalition, determined to overthrow Mongo's evil emperor and return Princess Thundar, Flash, Dale, and Zarkov to their native planets and restore Mongo to independence and freedom from Ming's cruelty.

Characters
 Alex "Flash" Gordon: The blond, teenage hero of the series. He is charismatic, daring, and always ready to impress Dale Arden (which doesn't always succeed). He met Dale during a skateboard contest, shortly before Ming's army attempted its first invasion on Earth. The name "Alex" is specific to this version.
 Dale Arden: Flash's dark-haired love interest, she is far removed from the original damsel in distress, being on the contrary courageous and sarcastic. She does have feelings for Flash, but also tends to refuse him just as much when things don't go her way. Like Flash, she is quite adept at skateboarding.
 Doctor Hans Zarkov: Flash and Dale's elderly, balding scientist ally. He met the pair during Ming's first invasion attempt of Earth and traveled with them to Mongo as part of his own experiments before being stuck after they destroyed the portal. Zarkov is brilliant, but extremely pessimistic and cowardly. He is normally unwilling to put himself in danger, no matter what. He is in direct rivalry with Sulpha, Ming's head scientist.
 Ming the Merciless: The militant ruler of Mongo, he supposedly has recently conquered many neighbor worlds, and now wants to invade Earth. Ming bears reptilian characteristics, just like the rest of his army, and whether or not his species was primeval to Mongo is unclear. His ruthless temper contrasts with his unconditional love for his daughter Aura. He once had a wife named Rosaura, supposedly dead since long ago.
 Princess Aura: Ming's teenage daughter who is half-reptilian/half-human. Unlike her father, Aura is more sympathetic to the people of Mongo's plight and goes out of her way to help Flash and his friends, but will not engage in any treason against Ming. Despite Ming's dissatisfaction in how Aura does not follow his example of being deceitful and manipulative, Aura is very good at playing people for her own needs. 
 General Lynch: Ming's sniveling, incompetent second-in-command. Lynch doesn't have much to explain in Ming's decisions, and just carries out the orders, attempting to have the job done by brute force and failing most of the time. Still, he is no less evil than his Emperor, and if Ming was not here, his schemes would be just as bad, if not worse.
 Kobalt: Ming's top mercenary, Kobalt is a Pantheron. He has a sort of rivalry with Lynch.
 Sulpha: Ming's female Dragon head scientist, charged with designing his weapons and ships. She is fully brilliant due to a binary brain, and is in a fierce rivalry with Doctor Zarkov for being the greatest scientist on Mongo. Sulpha is the last of her species, which was more than likely exterminated by Ming. She has a soft side in spite of her grumpy demeanor, with arguable loyalties, serving Ming but all the same hating him, and often helping out Flash and his allies when they're in a pinch.
 Talon: Flash' most prominent and gung-ho ally and Prince of the Birdmen of Hawk City, a species of winged human-like beings. Talon is a brave and enthusiastic man.
 Thundar: Another one of Flash' loyal allies, Thundar is a female Lionid, coming from a species of felinoids. She is an impetuous and excellent fighter, expert at hand-to-hand combat. She is based on Prince Thun of the Lion People from previous versions.
 Prince Barin: Renegade Prince of Arboria, first hostile to Flash and his friends. He nonetheless ends up joining them in their battle against Ming.

Production and series run
A multinational co-production, Flash Gordon came into weekly YTV, syndication and Channel 4 in Fall 1996. 26 episodes were produced.

Cast 

Voice talent:

 Lawrence Bayne as Prince Barin, General Arden, Chump
 Tyrone Benskin as Kobalt
 Dana Brooks as Sulpha
 Rob Cowan as Prince Harek
 Lexa Doig as Dale Arden
 Shirley Douglas as Queen Kayla
 Allegra Fulton as Queen Mardana
 Tracey Hoyt as Princess Aura
 Lorne Kennedy as Ming The Merciless, Ijad
 Ray Landry as General Lynch, Frank Gordon
 Julie Lemieux as Catherine Gordon
 Marjorie Malpass as Electra
 Andy Marshall as Prince Talon, King Vultan
 Toby Proctor as Flash Gordon
 Rino Romano as Jake
 Ron Rubin as Trog Queen
 Alison Sealy-Smith as Captain Valkyrie
 Paul Shaffer as Dr. Hans Zarkov
 Adrian Truss as Snurr
 Krista White as Thundar
 Lisa Yamanaka as Katie

Episode list

References

External links
Hearst Entertainment Animation
 

1996 American television series debuts
1997 American television series endings
1990s American animated television series
1990s American science fiction television series
1990s Canadian animated television series
1990s Canadian science fiction television series
1996 Canadian television series debuts
1997 Canadian television series endings
1996 French television series debuts
1997 French television series endings
American children's animated action television series
American children's animated space adventure television series
American children's animated science fantasy television series
American children's animated superhero television series
Canadian children's animated action television series
Canadian children's animated space adventure television series
Canadian children's animated science fantasy television series
Canadian children's animated superhero television series
French children's animated action television series
French children's animated space adventure television series
French children's animated science fantasy television series
French children's animated superhero television series
Flash Gordon television series
First-run syndicated television programs in the United States
English-language television shows
1990s French animated television series
Canal+ original programming
Teen animated television series
Teen superhero television series